Liao Lei may refer to:

 Liao Lei (general) (1890-1939), Chinese general
 Liao Lei (footballer) (born 1999), Chinese footballer